The first season of Weeds, an American dark comedy-drama television series created by Jenji Kohan, premiered on August 8, 2005, on the premium cable network Showtime. The principal cast consisted of Mary-Louise Parker, Elizabeth Perkins, Tonye Patano, Romany Malco, Justin Kirk, Hunter Parrish, Alexander Gould, and Kevin Nealon. The season had ten episodes, and its initial airing concluded on October 10, 2005. Season one focuses on Nancy Botwin (Parker), a single mother living in the suburban town of Agrestic, who begins dealing marijuana in an effort to maintain her family's upper middle class lifestyle following the death of her husband.

Plot 
Nancy Botwin and her children, Silas and Shane, live in Agrestic, a fictional suburb of Los Angeles. Her husband, Judah Botwin, dies of a heart attack while jogging with Shane a few weeks previously. During season one, Silas is fifteen years old and Shane is ten.

To support her upper middle class lifestyle, Nancy begins dealing marijuana to her affluent neighbors and friends. Her supplier is Heylia James, a major distributor in Los Angeles's West Adams district, whom she met through Judah's younger brother, Andy Botwin. Andy moves into the house after Judah's death to help Nancy out, though he also seems to be there to freeload, and often disrupts her life. After losing customers to a medical marijuana store, Nancy begins baking and selling pot-laced foods, with the help of Heylia's nephew, Conrad. On the advice of her accountant, city councilman Doug Wilson, she opens a retail bakery as a front for her drug sales. Silas begins dating Megan, an attractive deaf girl at his school, and starts to bond with Megan's father, who gives him boxing lessons and teaches him how to drive. Shane, troubled by his father's death, acts out, earning him the nickname "Strange Botwin" from his classmates. Shane's violent and strange behavior worries Nancy, who considers putting him on anti-depressants.

Nancy's chief antagonist is her neighbor, Celia Hodes, who is manic, image-obsessed, and manipulative. She is president of the Agrestic PTA, and does not get along with her cheating husband Dean, nor with her sexually active teenage daughter, Quinn, who she sends off to boarding school in Mexico. Her younger daughter, 11-year-old Isabelle, is overweight and the target of Celia's passive-aggressive comments, although Isabelle seems mature and confident for her age. Isabelle reveals late in the season that she is a lesbian, to her mother's chagrin. In the middle of the season, Celia gets diagnosed with bilateral breast cancer. The brush with her own mortality softens Celia's personality and leads her to treat Isabelle with more courtesy and respect. She quickly returns to form after her recovery. However, before her surgery, she meets Conrad and has sex with him. After Andy is notified to report immediately for his military service (where he will be trained and then sent to Iraq) or be sentenced to a military prison, he announces that he is studying to become a rabbi because he believes it will provide grounds for him to be discharged.

Drug dealing turns out to be more difficult than Nancy thought, as she discovers when she expands her customer base to Valley State College and hires Sanjay, a student at the college, to be her on-campus dealer. She is soon threatened by a rival drug dealer – Alejandro – who considers it his territory. She has a brief sexual encounter with him. At Valley College, Nancy's entire stash of product is stolen by a campus security guard during a fake arrest, threatening the survival of her lifestyle. Unbeknownst to her, Conrad and his friends attack and severely beat the security guard. As a result, the guard returns the marijuana to a puzzled Nancy, apologizes, and offers to help her business in any way he can. Meanwhile, Nancy develops a mutual attraction with Peter Scottson, a single father, and they end up sleeping together. Conrad, who has been growing a special strain of marijuana, approaches Nancy and convinces her to expand by becoming a grower as well as a dealer. The season closes with Nancy and Conrad forming a team, including Doug, Dean, Sanjay and Andy, to work their operation. However, Nancy then encounters a complication: she learns that her new boyfriend Peter is a DEA agent.

Cast

Main cast 
 Mary-Louise Parker as Nancy Botwin, a single mother and marijuana dealer
 Elizabeth Perkins as Celia Hodes, Botwin's self-centered neighbor
 Tonye Patano as Heylia James, Botwin's hardheaded drug supplier
 Romany Malco as Conrad Shepard, Botwin's initial supplier and James's nephew
 Justin Kirk as Andrew "Andy" Botwin, Botwin's carefree brother-in-law
 Hunter Parrish as Silas Botwin, the eldest Botwin child
 Alexander Gould as Shane Botwin, the youngest Botwin child
 Kevin Nealon as Doug Wilson, Botwin's irresponsible accountant

Recurring cast 

 Andy Milder as Dean Hodes, Hodes's unfaithful husband
 Renée Victor as Lupita, the Botwin family's maid
 Indigo as Vaneeta James, James's daughter and employee
 Shoshannah Stern as Silas Botwin's deaf girlfriend
 Tressa DiFiglia as Maggie, the Agrestic PTA chairman
 Allie Grant as Isabelle Hodes, Hodes's youngest daughter
 Becky Thyre as Pam Gruber, an Agrestic PTA member
 Shawn Schepps as Alison, an Agrestic PTA member
 Becky Thyre as Pam Gruber, an Agrestic PTA member
 Maulik Pancholy as Sanjay Patel, a college student who Botwin employees
 Vincent Laresca as Alejandro, Botwin's rival dealer
 Martin Donovan as Peter Scottson, Botwin's DEA agent boyfriend
 David Doty as Principal Dodge, the principal of Agrestic Elementary
 Jeffrey Dean Morgan as Judah Botwin, Botwin's late-husband
 Tyrone Mitchell as Keeyon James, James's son and employee
 Haley Hudson as Quinn Hodes, Hodes's eldest daughter
 Daryl Sabara as Tim Scottson, Scottson's son
 Justin Chatwin as Josh Wilson, Wilson's son
 Craig X. Rubin as Craig X, a marijuana dispensary employee

Episodes

Reception

Viewership 
Weeds debuted to 538,000 U.S. viewers, which was modest in comparison to the viewership of Showtime's other television series.

Critical response 
The season received generally positive reviews from critics. On Rotten Tomatoes, the first season of Weeds received 79%. The site's critics consensus reads: “Weeds is a cheeky comedy with dark, humorous, and sometimes outrageous moments centered around a talented female-led cast including Emmy winner Mary-Louise Parker.” On Metacritic, the first season received a 70 out of 100, indicating generally favorable reviews. Gillian Flynn of Entertainment Weekly spoke highly of Parker and Nealon's performances, and praised the acting of Perkins as Celia Hodes, writing “Perkins is so perfectly, nastily desperate that she gets away with it.” David Wiegand of the San Francisco Chronicle also praised the acting of Parker and Perkins, and stated “Weeds may indeed be the best written new show of the year.” Alessandra Stanley of The New York Times wrote "Weeds is well written and engrossing, and has a slick balance of satire and soap opera." Ed Gonzalez of Slant Magazine gave a mixed review of the season, praising the performances of Perkins and Gould, but criticizing the characterization of Nancy, commenting: “There’s a sense that the writers of Weeds are as lazy as their main character, that they understand her as little as she seems to understand herself.” However, Gonzalez spoke highly of Parker's acting, writing “Parker brings a great performance to a less than one-dimensional part.”

Some critics criticized the depiction of Heylia and her family, believing that the characters perpetuated harmful black stereotypes. Dana Stevens of Slate Magazine gave a positive review, but commented “the black characters, led by a sassy matriarch named Heylia [...] seemed to embody the most egregious of African-American stereotypes.” In an NPR interview, commentator Betty Bayé stated “[Weeds is] the latest chapter in a long history of negative black stereotypes in the media.” In response to the criticism, series creator Jenji Kohan commented that the characters of Heylia, Conrad and Vaneeta were inspired by her friends in Venice Beach, stating: “Heylia and her family are kind of [a] homage to that time in my life and those guys”, further commenting “I knew them, and this is my experience of how they spoke and how they related”.

Accolades 
The first season received numerous awards and nominations, including three Golden Globe Awards nominations with one win. Mary-Louise Parker won for Best Actress in a Television Series Musical or Comedy. The series was nominated for Best Television Series Musical or Comedy, and Elizabeth Perkins was nominated for Best Supporting Actress in a Series, Miniseries or Television Film. The show also received five Primetime Emmy Award nominations. It was nominated for Outstanding Casting for a Comedy Series, Outstanding Main Title Design, Outstanding Single-camera Picture Editing for a Comedy Series, Elizabeth Perkins was nominated for Outstanding Supporting Actress in a Comedy Series, and Craig Zisk was nominated for Outstanding Directing for a Comedy Series. Parker won a Satellite Award for Best Actress in a Musical or Comedy Series, and Perkins was nominated for the same category.

Home media 
On July 11, 2006, Lionsgate released the first season of Weeds on the DVD format; the season was released on the Blu-ray Disc format on May 29, 2007. In addition to the ten episodes, both formats contain bonus content including six audio commentaries, behind the scenes with cast and crew, two featurettes, and season trailers.

References

External links 
 
 

2005 American television seasons
2005 American television series debuts
Weeds (TV series) seasons